Gojed is a village on the Isfahan-Naeen road in Iran.

Populated places in Isfahan Province